Calcedonio is a masculine Italian given name. Notable people with the name include:

Calcedonio Di Pisa (1931–1962), Italian Mafiosi
Calcedonio Reina (1842–1911), Italian painter and poet

Italian masculine given names